Zambia is a developing country and it achieved middle-income status in 2011. Through the first decade of the 21st century, the economy of Zambia was one of the fastest growing economies in Africa and its capital, Lusaka the fastest growing city in the Southern African Development Community (SADC). Zambia's economic performance has stalled in recent years due to declining copper prices, significant fiscal deficits, and energy shortages.

Zambia is currently ranked 8th in Africa, 5th in the Southern African Development Community (SADC) and 4th in the Common Market for Eastern and Southern Africa (COMESA) in terms of the ease of doing business. Furthermore, Zambia is ranked the 8th most competitive country in Africa on the Global Competitiveness Index. Recently, Zambia was ranked 7th by Forbes as the best country for doing business among 54 African countries.

The government has succeeded in reducing the cost of doing business, but other important indicators of the business environment, such as restrictions on trade and government and judicial integrity have deteriorated.

Zambia itself is one of Sub-Saharan Africa's most highly urbanized countries. About one-half of the country's 16 million people are concentrated in a few urban zones strung along the major transportation corridors, while rural areas are under-populated. Unemployment and underemployment are serious problems. National GDP has actually doubled since independence. But due in large part to high birth rates per capita, annual incomes are currently at about two-thirds of their levels at independence. As of 2019, Zambia's  GDP per capita (current international dollars) stands at $1,305.00 .

In the area of trade, Zambia recorded a positive trade balance of US$300.6 million in 2014, as well as an increase in non-traditional exports (NTEs) over the years from US$1,381.8million in 2010 to US$3,550.3 million in 2013. Copper and cobalt are among Zambia's main exports while non-traditional exports include cotton, coffee, fresh flowers, burley tobacco, gemstones and maize (corn) among others.
Zambia is also eligible to export duty-free goods to the United States under the African Growth and Opportunity Act (AGOA). The Act allows eligible countries from sub-Saharan Africa to export over 6,400 goods to the United States.

For the first time since 1989, in 2007 Zambia's economic growth reached the 6%–7% mark needed to reduce poverty significantly.  Copper output has increased steadily since 2004, due to higher copper prices and the opening of new mines. The maize harvest was again good in 2005, helping boost GDP and agricultural exports. Cooperation continues with international bodies on programs to reduce poverty, including a new lending arrangement with the IMF in the second quarter of 2004. A tighter monetary policy will help cut inflation, but Zambia still has a serious problem with high public debt.

In October 2021, to spur economic development, Zambia took measures to promote local development in its ambitious 2022 national budget. The Government announced an unprecedented constituency development fund (CDF) increment from ZMW 1.6 million (U$91,000) to ZMW 25.7 million (U$1.5million) for each constituency taking the total development fund injection into the local communities from ZMW 250 million (U$14.2 million) to ZMW 4 billion (U$228.4 million). After winning a crucial Staff-Level IMF Deal, in early December 2021, Zambia went on to cut fuel subsidies later that month as a key step in seeking U$1.4 billion from the IMF.

At the end of July 2022, the Official Creditor Committee co-chaired by China and France, and vice chaired by South Africa agreed to provide the financing assurances under the G20 Common Framework for debt treatment that Zambia had been waiting for to secure final approval from the International Monetary Fund for a US$1.4 billion bailout under the Extended Credit Facility. In early August 2022, at the symposium on the midyear budget and economic performance and the 2023 to 2025 medium term budget plan, Zambia's Minister of Finance and National Planning, Dr. Situmbeko Musokotwane said the IMF board was expected to meet at the end of August 2022 to approve the loan programme.

On 31 August 2022, the International Monetary Fund (IMF) board approved a US$1.3 billion extended credit facility to help Zambia restore fiscal stability.

History

Economic policies soon after independence (1964–1967) 

The British South Africa Company (BSAC, originally set up by the British imperialist Cecil Rhodes) retained commercial assets and mineral rights that it acquired from a concession signed with the Litunga of Barotseland in 1892 (the Lochner Concession). Only by threatening to expropriate the BSAC, on the eve of independence, did the incoming Zambian government manage to get the BSAC to relinquish the mineral rights. The Federation's government assigned roles to each of the three territories: Southern Rhodesia was assigned the responsibility of providing managerial and administrative skills; Northern Rhodesia provided copper revenues; and Nyasaland provided the Black labour.

After independence, Zambia instituted a program of national development plans, under the direction of a National Commission for Development Planning: the Transitional Development Plan (1964–66) was followed by the First National Development Plan (1966–71). These two plans, which provided for major investment in infrastructure and manufacturing, were largely implemented and were generally successful. This was not true for subsequent plans

The Mulungushi Economic Reforms (1968) 

A major switch in the structure of Zambia's economy came with the Mulungushi Reforms of April 1968: the government declared its intention to acquire equity holdings (usually 51% or more) in a number of key foreign-owned firms, to be controlled by a parastatal conglomerate named the Industrial Development Corporation (INDECO). By January 1970, Zambia had acquired majority holding in the Zambian operations of the two major foreign mining corporations, the Anglo American Corporation and the Rhodesia Selection Trust (RST); the two became the Nchanga Consolidated Copper Mines (NCCM) and Roan Consolidated Mines (RCM), respectively. The Zambian government then created a new parastatal body, the Mining Development Corporation (MINDECO). The Finance and Development Corporation (FINDECO) allowed the Zambian government to gain control of insurance companies and building societies. However, foreign-owned banks (such as Barclays, Standard Chartered and Grindlays) successfully resisted takeover. In 1971, INDECO, MINDECO, and FINDECO were brought together under an omnibus parastatal, the Zambia Industrial and Mining Corporation (ZIMCO), to create one of the largest companies in sub-Saharan Africa, with the country's president, Kenneth Kaunda as chairman of the board. The management contracts under which day-to-day operations of the mines had been carried out by Anglo American and RST were ended in 1973. In 1982 NCCM and RCM were merged into the giant Zambia Consolidated Copper Mines Ltd (ZCCM).

In 1973 a massive increase in the price of oil was followed by a slump in copper prices in 1975, resulting in a diminution of export earnings. In 1973 the price of copper accounted for 95% of all export earnings; this halved in value on the world market in 1975. By 1976 Zambia had a balance-of-payments crisis, and rapidly became massively indebted to the International Monetary Fund (IMF). The Third National Development Plan (1978–83) had to be abandoned as crisis management replaced long-term planning.

By the mid-1980s Zambia was one of the most indebted nations in the world, relative to its gross domestic product (GDP). The IMF was insisting that the Zambian government should introduce programs aimed at stabilizing the economy and restructuring it to reduce dependence on copper. The proposed measures included: the ending of price controls; devaluation of the kwacha (Zambia's currency); cut-backs in government expenditure; cancellation of subsidies on food and fertilizer; and increased prices for farm produce. Kaunda's removal of food subsidies caused massive increases in the prices of basic foodstuffs; the country's urbanized population rioted in protest. In desperation, Kaunda broke with the IMF in May 1987 and introduced a New Economic Recovery Programme in 1988. However, this did not help him and he eventually moved toward a new understanding with the IMF in 1989. In 1990 Kaunda was forced to make a major policy volteface: he announced the intention to partially privatize the parastatals. Time, however, was running out for him. Like many African independence leaders Kaunda tried to hang on to power but unlike many he called multiparty elections and lost them (to the Movement for Multiparty Democracy (MMD))and abided by the results. Kaunda left office with the inauguration of MMD leader Frederick Chiluba as president on 2 November 1991.

Chiluba's economic reforms (1991–2000) 

Zambia's Economic System of Government is Unitary because of that the Frederick Chiluba government (1991–2001), which came to power after democratic multi-party elections in November 1991, was committed to extensive economic reform.

Zambia's  economic  transformation  into  a  free  market  system  began  toward  the  end  of  1991  following a change of government. To tackle a serious economic crisis, the government agreed to introduce substantial economic reforms to secure much-needed loans from the World Bank and IMF.

One of the greatest challenges was the privatization of the country's copper mines, Zambia's prime export earner. The government privatised many state industries, and maintained positive real interest rates.  Exchange controls were eliminated and free market principles endorsed. It remains to be seen whether the Mwanawasa government will follow a similar path of implementing economic reform and undertaking further privatization.  Zambia has yet to address issues such as reducing the size of the public sector, which still represents 44% of total formal employment, and improving Zambia's social sector delivery systems.

After the government privatized the giant parastatal mining company Zambian Consolidated Copper Mines (ZCCM), donors resumed balance-of-payment support. The final transfer of ZCCM's assets occurred on March 31, 2000. Although balance-of-payment payments are not the answer to Zambia's long-term debt problems, it will in the short term provide the government some breathing room to implement further economic reforms. The government has, however, spent much of its foreign exchange reserves to intervene in the exchange rate mechanism. To continue to do so, however, would jeopardize Zambia's debt relief. Zambia qualified for HIPC debt relief in 2000, contingent upon the country meeting certain performance criteria, and this should offer a long-term solution to Zambia's debt situation.

2001–2010 
On 2 January 2002, MMD's Levy Mwanawasa won the Presidential election which many observers claimed had actually been won by the opposition. In January 2003, the Zambian Government informed the International Monetary Fund and World Bank that it wished to renegotiate some of the agreed performance criteria calling for privatization of the Zambia National Commercial Bank and the national telephone and electricity utilities.

Foreign investors liked Mwanawasa, owing partly to his anti-corruption drive. During his presidency, Zambia received foreign investment. The main driver of economic growth was minerals. Mwanawasa's policies helped to lower inflation to single digits in 2006, a record the country had not seen in over 25 years, and spread some benefits to the poor. Tourists and white farmers diverted from Zimbabwe and helped the Zambian economy. The policies turned the Zambian town of Livingstone, near Victoria Falls, into a tourist hub. Zambia received a relatively large amount of aid and debt relief because of liberalisation and Mwanawasa's efforts. Overall, economic growth increased to about 6% per year.

After Mwanawasa suffered a stroke while attending an African Union summit in Egypt on 29 June 2008, Rupiah Banda became acting president and subsequently President. With divisions within the MMD, Banda promised to "unite the party and the entire nation" and to "continue implementing [Mwanawasa's] programs". Though, after taking office, Banda dismantled much of the anti-corruption effort put into place by his predecessor, Mwanawasa. This, compounded with the effects of the Global Financial crisis of 2007–2008 led to a sustained period of increased inflation.

2011–2020 
In September 2011, the social democrat, Michael Sata led the Patriotic Front (PF) to victory with a vow to improve conditions for their Zambian employees. Though known to previously oppose Chinese investment, he declared his change in perspective prior to his election victory. Sata died on 28 October 2014 and was succeeded by Edgar Lungu. The period, saw an infrastructure boom with the development of the Kafue Gorge Lower Power Station, two multi-purpose stadiums, Levy Mwanawasa Stadium and National Heroes Stadium, expansions of the Kenneth Kaunda International Airport, the Harry Mwanga Nkumbula International Airport and the Simon Mwansa Kapwepwe International Airport, and the Pave Zambia 2000 project intended to create and repair major urban roads countrywide.

Unfortunately this came at a huge debt cost that slowed the economy and compounded by corruption and the COVID-19 pandemic resulted in weak GDP growth and a recession in 2019 and 2020 respectively. Zambia's GDP had shrunk from US$29 billion to US$19 billion and its debt grew from 16% to 140% of GDP from 2010 through 2020. In November 2020, Zambia became Africa's first coronavirus-era default when it opted to bow out of a US$42.5 million eurobond repayment.

From 2021 
In August 2021, the Zambian populace ushered in a new government with a promise for jobs growth. Hakainde Hichilema's United Party for National Development (UPND) government delivered an ambitious budget that included an increase in the Constituency Development Fund (CDF) from ZMW 1.6 million (US$91 thousand) to ZMW 25.7 million (US$1.5 million) for each of Zambia's 156 constituencies and its decentralization in release to these constituencies. The expectation is that this will generate jobs growth in addition to the government's targeted employment of 30,000 new teachers and 11,200 health workers. In mid July 2022, the government recruited 30,496 Teachers. At the end of July 2022, 11,276 health workers, being doctors, nurses and ancillary staff such as drivers were recruited by the government.

With a push for Zambia to be able to produce 3 million tonnes of Copper per annum within the next 10 years, the government reintroduced the deductibility of mineral royalty for corporate income tax assessment purposes. The results of these policy changes are yet to be seen.

At the 2022 IMF-World Bank Spring Meetings, the World Bank announced it would fund projects worth US$560 million in Zambia in 2022.

In July 2022, to address its debt challenges, the Zambian government engaged creditors of undisbursed loans to facilitate the formal cancellation of loans estimated to be about US$2.0 billion. Projects that were already ongoing would now be financed through government revenues.

In early August 2022, the Zambia Development Agency,  a quasi-government institution under the Ministry of Commerce, Trade and Industry reported that it had recorded numerous investment pledges worth US$3.8 billion in the first half to 2022 targeting the agriculture, tourism, construction and mining sectors with a potential job market of 19,000.

Public-Private Dialogue Forum (PPDF) 
In April 2022, Zambia launched a mechanism aimed at unlocking the potential of the private sector as a driver of economic development and job creation. The Public-Private Dialogue Forum (PPDF) is meant to act as a structured mechanism for interactions between the public and the private sector in tackling bottlenecks that have hindered the growth of the private sector.

European Union (EU)–Zambia Economic Forum 
In May 2022, the inaugural European Union (EU)-Zambia Economic Forum was launched in Lusaka by President Hakainde Hichilema under the theme ‘Economic transformation through green growth’. It was a high-level event that brought together entrepreneurs, experts, financial institutions, innovators, and policy decision-makers from Zambia, the EU and representatives of its 27 member states. Additional special guests included the EU Commissioner for Agriculture Janusz Wojciechowski and the commissioner for Trade and Industry of the African Union Commission, Albert M. Muchanga. The forum was launched as a platform with a view to promoting employment, value addition and increased trade through business-to-business (B2B) and business-to-government (B2G) collaboration and economic synergies for EU and Zambian businesses.

UK–Zambia Green Growth Compact 
In November 2021, the Zambian and British government signed the UK-Zambia Green Growth Compact, an agreement expected to boost the United Kingdom's investment into Zambia by £ 1.0 billion (US$1.26 billion) with a focus on job creation and green energy production. In May 2022, the British High Commissioner to Zambia Nicholas Woolley, indicated that the British government had set aside the  £ 1.0 billion to be spent over the next 5 years with £ 100.0 million (US$126.0 million) targeted for funding Small Medium Entrepreneurs (SMEs) and £ 500.0 million (US$629.9 million) for investment in renewable energy.

World Bank Support 
In July 2022, the World Bank approved US$155.0 million in International Development Assistance for Social Cash Transfer to mitigate the high cost of living pressures in Zambia and a further US$27.0 million credit facility to support the government's development programs.

In July 2022, the World Bank approved a further US$665.0 million to fund projects in Zambia to spur economic recovery and growth and also lighten the debt burden. Through 2032, the World Bank plans to support Zambia with new financing of over US$2.0 billion in the form of concessional loans.

In late October 2022, the World Bank approved US$275.0 million concessional loan targeted at fiscal stabilization and accelerated economic programs. Financing was provided by the World Bank's International Development Association (IDA).

African Export-Import Bank (Afreximbank) Support 
In July 2022, the African Export-Import Bank President Benedict Oramah, whilst in Lusaka Zambia, announced that the bank would put up an investment of about US$250 million for Zambia's first-ever Battery Electric Vehicle (BEV) manufacturing plant.

EAC-SADC-COMESA Free Trade Area 
In July 2022, during the 4th Mid-Year Coordination Meeting of the African Union, Regional Economic Communities and Regional Mechanisms in Lusaka, Zambia, the three regional blocs, East African Community (EAC), Southern African Development Community (SADC), and Common Market for Eastern and Southern Africa (COMESA) agreed to have a tripartite ministers' summit to fast track the finalization of the border control-free travel and free movement of goods and services area by the end of 2022.

Zambia-China Trade and Investment Forum 
In September 2022, Zambia and China launched the inaugural trade and investment forum aimed at unlocking trade and investment potential between the two countries. The event also saw the signing of an Exchange Letter of the Duty Free Treatment for Zambian products corresponding to 98-percent of the tariff lines by Finance Minister Situmbeko Musokotwane and Chinese Ambassador to Zambia Du Xiao.

U.S.-Zambia Business Summit 
In October 2022, more than 50 United States and Zambian business and government leaders gathered in Lusaka for the two-day inaugural U.S.-Zambia Business Summit at the Intercontinental Hotel. Representatives from the U.S. Trade and Development Agency, U.S. International Development Finance Corporation also attended the Summit. The Summit focused on promoting Zambia as one of the most attractive business environments for investment on the African continent.

Sectors

Mining 

In 2019, the country was the world's 7th largest producer of copper.

The Zambian economy has historically been based on the copper-mining industry. The industrialization of the copper industry is owed partly to Frederick Russell Burnham, the famous American scout who worked for Cecil Rhodes. By 1998, however, output of copper had fallen to a low of 228,000 tonnes, continuing a 30-year decline in output due to lack of investment, and until recently, low copper prices and uncertainty over privatization. In 2001, the first full year of a privatized industry, Zambia recorded its first year of increased productivity since 1973. The future of the copper industry in Zambia was thrown into doubt in January 2002, when investors in Zambia's largest copper mine announced their intention to withdraw their investment. However, surging copper prices from 2004 to the present day rapidly rekindled international interest in Zambia's copper sector with a new buyer found for KCCM and massive investments in expanding capacity launched. China has become a major investor in the Zambian copper industry, and in February 2007, the two countries announced the creation of a Chinese-Zambian economic partnership zone around the Chambishi copper mine.

Today copper mining is central to the economic prospects for Zambia and covers 85% of all the country's exports, but concerns remain that the economy is not diversified enough to cope with a collapse in international copper prices.

In January 2013, the Zambia Environmental Management Agency (ZEMA) approved 27 mining and exploration licences, with more rumoured to be confirmed.

In the first half of 2011, the Kagem Mines produced 3.74 tons of emeralds. In April 2022, Gemfields, the majority owner in the mine, recorded a record U$42.3 million at a sold out March/April auction and since 2009, Kagem-sourced gemstones (emerald and beryl) have netted Gemfields revenue totaling U$792 million with the proceeds fully repatriated to Kagem in Zambia, with all royalties due to the Zambian government paid on the full sales prices achieved at auctions.

Rich deposits of Uranium have been discovered in some parts of Zambia. In 2007, the Zambian government sought scrutiny and  guidance from the International Atomic Energy Agency (IAEA) on its developed guidelines to regulate the mining of uranium in the country. In 2008, deposits were found in Kaputa District, Northern Province. Albidon Zambia Limited also confirmed the presence of high-grade uranium mineralisation at its Njame east project near Chirundu. In the Southern Province, 31 km North of Siavonga, and north of Lake Kariba, there are 5 main Uranium Deposits: Mutanga, Dibwe, Dibwe East, Njame, and Gwabe explored under The Mutanga Uranium Project. The Canadian Toronto Stock Exchange (TSX) listed GoviEx Uranium Inc acquired 100% of the Mutanga Project also known as the Kariba Uranium Project in 2016. In March 2022, GoviEx announced that the Project is forecast to start production in 2027 and could be the lowest capital intensive uranium project in Africa.

Lumwana Mining Company Limited (LMC) who had embarked on uranium exploration in 2007 in Solwezi District are currently stock piling uranium that the firm is getting as a by-product of Copper from its operations as they are yet to obtain a uranium license. The mining of uranium in Zambia is monitored by the Zambia Environmental Management Agency (ZEMA).

See Also:

 Munali Nickel Mine estimated development cost U$180 million in 2007
 Enterprise Nickel Project estimated development cost U$275 million

Agriculture 
The agriculture sector represented 2.7% GDP in 2019. Agriculture accounted for 85% of total employment (formal and informal) for 2000. Maize (corn) is the principal cash crop as well as the staple food. Other important crops include soybean, cotton, sugar, sunflower seeds, wheat, sorghum, pearl millet, cassava, tobacco and various vegetable and fruit crops. Floriculture is a growth sector, and agricultural non-traditional exports now rival the mining industry in foreign exchange receipts. Zambia has the potential for significantly increasing its agricultural output; currently, less than 20% of its arable land is cultivated. In the past, the agriculture sector suffered from low producer prices, difficulties in availability and distribution of credit and inputs, and the shortage of foreign exchange.

In 2019 Zambia produced:

 4.7 million tons of sugarcane;
 4 million tons of cassava (18th largest producer in the world);
 2 million tons of maize;
 281 thousand tons of soy;
 153 thousand tons of tobacco (6th largest producer in the world);
 151 thousand tons of wheat;
 130 thousand tons of peanut;
 109 thousand tons of sweet potato;
 72 thousand tons of cotton;
 6,900 tons of coffee;

In addition to other productions of other agricultural products.

Due to high demand for flour in neighboring Democratic Republic of the Congo DRC, Zambia increased Wheat production from 205,000 tonnes in 2020 to 400,000 tonnes 2021.

In July 2022, Zambia and China sealed a memorandum of understanding on soya bean meal and stevia export from Zambia to China.

Fisheries and Livestock 
The Fisheries and Livestock sub-sector in Zambia contributes to employment creation, food and nutrition security, and economic growth. 

In livestock, Zambia produced, in 2019: 191 thousand tons of beef; 50 thousand tons of chicken meat; 34 thousand tons of pork; 453 million liters of cow's milk, among others.

Energy 
Energy in Zambia is the production of energy and electricity, for consumption or export. The Energy Regulation Board (ERB) has the mandate to balance and safeguard the interests of all energy stakeholders. The Energy policy is as guided by the Energy Regulation Act No. 12 of 2019, the Electricity Act No. 11 of 2019 and the Rural Electrification Act No.20 of 2003.

Electricity 

In 2019, Zambia generated a total of 15,013GWh of Energy. 12,427GWh was Renewable and 2,586 GWh was non-renewable. Over 99% of the Renewable energy component was Hydro electricity.

With a view to diversifying the power generation profile, Zambia increased its Solar Power generation Capacity in 2019.

In March 2019, the 54MW Bangweulu Solar Power Station was commissioned.

In May 2019, the 34MW Ngonye Solar Power Station was commissioned.

In July 2022, the local National utility ZESCO, announced it had achieved an electricity generation surplus of about 1,156 MW. Zambia's national generation capacity stands at 3,456.8 MW versus a peak national demand of 2,300 MW. The surplus power is to be directed to service the power supply agreements for the export of 180 MW to Namibia and 100 MW to Zimbabwe. The exportation of 100MW electricity to Zimbabwe which is set to commence in August 2022 is under a five year contract with a condition precedent that ZESCO earns monthly income of US$6.3 million prior exporting to Zimbabwe.

The close of 2022 brought in some serious challenges to the Zambian economy, when low water levels at the Kariba Dam significantly impacted the 1080MW Kariba Hydro Power plant's output capacity and resulted in load shedding for businesses and residents across the country. This was compounded by the maintenance that was being carried out at the 300MW Maamba Coilleries Coal Fired Power Plant.

In January 2023, Zambia signed a US$2 billion dollar MOU and Joint Development Agreement (JDA) with the United Arab Emirates for the development of 2000MW of Solar Power Projects.

Petroleum 
Zambia is a net importer of petroleum and in 2019, Oil & Mineral Fuels ranked top amongst the country's trade imports at a value of U$1.26 billion.

In January 2022, the ERB migrated from a Quarterly pricing cycle to a monthly pricing cycle to enable the  local price of fuel to be more responsive to the market fundamentals namely: international oil prices and the Kwacha/US Dollar exchange rate prevailing in the month preceding the pricing decision. Further, following the UPND governments' policy decision to place INDENI Petroleum Refinery on care and maintenance, the nation moved to one type of Diesel sold on the market, and that is the imported Low Sulphur Gasoil/Diesel.

*Final rate on quarterly price cycle.

**Excise Duty and VAT Restored.

Bulk Fuel Depots in Zambia are listed below:

See also:  Tazama Pipeline, Indeni Petroleum Refinery and Lobito–Lusaka Oil Products Pipeline.

In January 2023, Zambia announced plans to acquire a stake in its neighbor Angola's Lobito Oil Refinery located in Benguela Province along the Atlantic Coast. The Lobito refinery, that is set to be completed in 2026, will have the capacity to produce 200,000 barrels per day. Under the current proposal, private investors, including Zambia, will own 70% shares in the refinery, while Angola's state oil firm, Sonangol Group, will hold 30% ownership.

Tourism 

Zambia's tourism revenue has been generally raised from local and international tourists visiting the Victoria Falls in Livingstone, and its associated attractions such as the Livingstone Museum and the Mosi-oa-Tunya National Park. In July 2020, the Livingstone Tourism Association reported that during the Heroes and Unity holidays the holiday site received a record number of visitors. Celebrities such as Will Smith  and some Entrepreneur have visited the tourist site with the latter celebrating her £3 million nuptials in a picturesque ceremony at The Royal Livingstone Hotel by the banks of the Zambezi River.

To advance home grown tourism, in March 2021, African Eagle Hotels, a multi-national company, stated that a 2 Star and 5 Star Hotel each costing U$20 million and U$30 million would be constructed and opened at the Kasaba Bay Resort located in the Nsumbu National Park and open by 2023. In October 2021, through its national budget, the government also allocated ZMW 150 million (U$8.6 million) to further the development of Kasaba Bay, to spur tourism in the Northern Circuit of Zambia.

Manufacturing 

Below is a table for the Composite Purchasing Managers' Index (PMI) Manufacturing Pulse in Zambia. 50 sets the benchmark, for expansion ->50 and expansion -<50.

Education 
As of 2022, Zambia runs a free education policy at public early childhood and secondary schools.

 Education in Zambia
 List of schools in Zambia
 List of universities in Zambia

Finance and Banking Services 

 Central Bank: Bank of Zambia (BOZ)
 List of banks in Zambia

BOZ purchases gold locally from Kansanshi Copper Mine and the Zambia Gold Company for its reserves.

Media 

 Mass media in Zambia

Infrastructure 
There are many forms of transport in Zambia. Zambia is highly dependent on road transport.

 Transport in Zambia
 Roads in Zambia
 List of airports in Zambia.
 Rail transport in Zambia
 Water transport in Zambia

Growth

There are, however, positive macroeconomic signs, rooted in reforms implemented in the early and mid-1990s. Zambia's floating exchange rate and open capital markets have provided useful discipline on the government, while at the same time allowing continued diversification of Zambia's export sector, growth in the tourist industry, and procurement of inputs for growing businesses. Some parts of the Copper Belt have experienced a significant revival as spin-off effects from the massive capital reinvestment are experienced.

Export Diversification 
As Zambia continued on its path to diversifying from dependence on Copper with an emphasis on growth in agriculture, in April 2022, the country's  Ministry of Agriculture through the Plant Quarantine and Phytosanitary Service (PQPS) approved the first consignment of over 37 metric tons of Zambian grown avocados for export to countries in the European Union.

The Multi-Facility Economic Zones (MFEZ) 
In 2005, the Japanese Government through Japan International Corporation Agency (JICA) aided the Zambia government to introduce the Multi- Facility Economic Zone (MFEZ) programme. The aim is to  create a platform for Zambia to achieve economic development by attracting significant domestic and foreign direct investment (FDI) through a strengthened policy and legislative environment. The MFEZs are, special industrial zones for both export-oriented and domestic-oriented industries. The zones are expected to have well appointed infrastructure in place in order to attract and facilitate establishment of world-class enterprises in the zone (s).

Among the MFEZ investment incentives offered for companies operating under the MFEZ/Priority Sector include:

Currently there are numerous MFEZs in Zambia:

The Lusaka South Multi-Facility Economic Zone (LS-MFEZ) 
Established in June 2012, the zone prioritizes agribusiness, packaging and printing, palm oil processing, pulp and packaging boards, pharmaceuticals, electrical and electronic appliances, ICTs, education and skills training, R&D, professional, medical, scientific and measuring services.

In 2020, the LS-MFEZ realised US$100.6 million worth of investments bringing the accumulated investments to about US$567.6 million and generating about 7,100 jobs since commencing operations in 2012.

In 2021, the LS-MFEZ realised a record US$309.4 million worth of investments bringing the accumulated investments to about US$877.4 million with permanent jobs at about 9,360 and total jobs including construction workers at 11,560.

The Lusaka East Multi-Facility Economic Zone 
This zone is also known as the Zambia-China Economic & Trade Cooperation Zone (ZCCZ).

The zone prioritizes agriculture (circular and tourism agricultures), agro-processing, brewery, pharmaceuticals, building materials, logistics (storage) and international commerce.

Roma Industrial and Commercial Park 
Launched in 2011, is expected to generate more than 4,000 permanent jobs once fully developed and is focused on real estate and residential developments.

Chambishi Multi-Facility Economic Zone (CMFEZ) 
Opened in 2007, prioritizes mining, engineering equipment assembly, construction materials, fertilizers, agriculture, and service sectors such as banking and hospitals.

By 2016, the CMFEZ had already received investment of about US$800 million from 14 enterprises.

Chembe Multi-Facility Economic Zone 
In 2016, the government launched the development of the Chembe Multi-Facility Economic Zone in Chembe, Luapula Province.

Chibombo Multi-Facility Economic Zone 
Located in Chibombo District, Central Province, Zambia, the ground breaking for this zone was held in November 2018 and is also known as the Jiangxi Multi-Facility Economic Zone.

In October 2021, the Chibombo MFEZ signed six project agreements worth US$160 million projected to create over 1,000 jobs.

Lumwana Multi-Facility Economic Zone 
In November 2009, the government of Zambia announced a plan for a US$1.2 billion investment into the declared Lumwana Multi-Facility Economic Zone.

Sub-Saharan Gemstones Exchange Industrial Park 
This Multi-Facility Economic Zone (MFEZ) is located in Ndola, Copperbelt Province.

By October 2011, over US$10 million had been invested in the infrastructure in the MFEZ.

Kalumbila Multi-Facility Economic Zone (MFEZ) 
Located in North-Western Province, this MFEZ received approval by the Ministry of Commerce, Trade and Industry in September 2022.

The expected initial investment was approximately US$100 million.

The facility was intended to offer local vendors an industrial base to set up a local supply chain for the growing Kalumbila copper mine, upcoming Enterprise nickel mine, and other businesses around the First Quantum Minerals (FQM) sites.

Actualized Investments

Fintech 
Zambia has a relatively quiet startup and venture capital space; however, the trend seems to be shifting as in August 2021 fintech company Union54 led the way by being the first Zambian startup accepted into Y Combinator's summer batch of YC 2021. In October 2021, American investment firm Tiger Global led a U$3 million seed round in Union54. And in April 2022, the Zambian company raised an additional U$12 million in a seed extension round also led by Tiger Global.

Salaula 

Standard economic theory and empirical data indicates that second-hand clothing import can have positive effects in a country like Zambia (one of the least developed countries in the world). The salaula market reduces the proportion of income that a family has to spend on clothing. It also helps to keep employments like repairs and alterations in business and forces tailors to proceed into more specialize production of styled garments.

There is a downside to such imports, however; the massive importation of used clothing from the developed world has resulted in a near-total collapse of the Zambian indigenous textile industry.  In the face of cheap used clothing, tailors' specialized production may be irrelevant - customers will buy the least expensive clothing available, irrespective of style.  Those who might otherwise work at textile mills or clothing factories are left jobless, or else make significantly less money in the salaula resale business.

Electric Battery Value Chain 
Zambia and Democratic Republic of the Congo (DRC), two countries, that have more than 70% of the world's Cobalt reserves and an abundance of Copper, Nickel and Manganese have resolved to set up a Zambia-DRC-Executive Battery Council to oversee the implementation of the cooperating agreement for the electric vehicle battery value chain. The Executive Council's executive committee will be composed of President Hakainde Hichilema, his DRC counterpart Felix Tshisekedi, the Deputy Secretary General of the African Economic Community for the United Nations, as well as the President of AFREXIM Bank, as a financial partner. Also issued was a communiqué by the two heads of state that indicated that the two countries will also harmonize policies for the initiative. Zambia and the DRC signed the MOU in Lusaka Zambia on 29 April 2022.

In July 2022, the African Export-Import Bank President Benedict Oramah, whilst in Lusaka Zambia, announced that a pool of investors had earmarked more than US$500.0 million to set up an industrial park for the purposes of adding value to the copper, cobalt, and manganese mined in Zambia. The investors will set up plants to process cobalt, copper, and lithium that are in Zambia and neighboring countries and establish a US$250 million Battery Electric Vehicle (BEV) manufacturing plant.

In July 2022, at the 94th Agricultural and Commercial Show in Lusaka, the managing director of the National Utility ZESCO, Victor Mapani announced that the company plans to deploy Electric Vehicle EV charging stations across the country in an effort to accelerate and promote the transition to EVs and enhance carbon emission reduction.

In December 2022, on the sidelines of the ongoing US-Africa summit in Washington DC, Zambia, the Democratic Republic of the Congo (DRC) and the United States of America signed an MOU toward the actualization of the electric vehicle battery value chain. Different US institutions and agencies such as USAID, the US Department of Commerce, the Trade and Development Agency, are exploring technical assistance for the Zambia-DRC EV supply chain. Additionally, the Export-Import Bank of the United States, the Development Finance Corporation, will be exploring financing and support mechanisms for investment in African electric vehicle value chains.

Inflation

Lack of balance-of-payment support meant the Zambian government did not have resources for capital investment and periodically had to issue bonds or otherwise expand the money supply to try to meet its spending and debt obligations. The government continued these activities even after balance-of-payment support resumed. This has kept interest rates at levels that are too high for local business, fuelled inflation, burdened the budget with domestic debt payments, while still falling short of meeting the public payroll and other needs, such as infrastructure rehabilitation. The government was forced to draw down foreign exchange reserves sharply in 1998 to meet foreign debt obligations, putting further pressure on the kwacha and inflation. Inflation held at 32% in 2000; consequently, the kwacha lost the same value against the dollar over the same period. In mid- to late 2001, Zambia's fiscal management became more conservative. As a result, 2001 year-end inflation was below 20%, its best result in decades. In 2002 inflation rose to 26.7%. However, in 2007 inflation hit 8%, the first time in 30 years that Zambia had seen single digit inflation.

On January 27, 2011, it was reported by the Central Statistical Office that inflation rose to 9%. in 2012

Between April  2019 and April 2020 Zambia' s Annual inflation rate rose to 15.7% from 14% in March 2020. The rise  of prices in food and other non- food items led to the increase in the Annual inflation rate.

However, it is significant that inflation often peaks in election years, hitting a recent high of 17.9% in 2016. This  suggests  that  a  further  peak  is  likely  approaching  during  the  2021  general  elections. The value of the kwacha against the dollar has been relatively consistent for the past two years and has yet to return to the recent high of almost 0.2 kwacha to the dollar in 2013. Nonetheless, the real effective exchange rate of the kwacha against a weighted average of foreign currencies improved from 88.5 in 2016 to 96.4 in 2017. The kwacha lost value against the dollar in September 2018 but has remained fairly consistent at 0.08 to the dollar in November to December, though further instability remains likely due to both political and economic uncertainty.

Economic Statistics

Trade 

 
Major trade enhancing infrastructure projects carried out in Zambia's history:

 TAZARA Railway commissioned in 1975 for a cost of US $406 million (the equivalent of US $ billion in 2022 USD rate).
 Kazungula Bridge, commissioned in May 2021 for a cost of US$259.3 million.
 Levy Mwanawasa (Chembe) Bridge, commissioned in October 2008 for a cost of US$1.5 million.

Major Exhibitions 

 Zambia International Trade Fair held annually in Ndola at the beginning of July.
 Agriculture and Commercial Show held annually in Lusaka at the beginning of August.
 Central Province Agriculture Show, held in Mkushi.

Notable Companies 

 List of companies of Zambia
 Lusaka Stock Exchange LuSE

Public Private Partnerships (PPP) 
In December 2021, Zambia's UPND Government set up the Public-Private Partnership (PPP) Council of Ministers composed of the Minister of Finance and National Planning Dr. Situmbeko Musokotwane as the Chairperson and the Ministers of Infrastructure Charles Milupi, Commerce, Trade, and Industry Chipoka Mulenga, Transport and Logistics Frank Tayali, and Technology and Science Felix Mutati. The focus of the council is to have public-private partnerships become the primary avenue for infrastructure development as opposed to the solely government funded path,

Constituency Development Funds Performance 
Decentralized funds directed at enhancing public service delivery and targeted at local communities to spur economic development at ward and constituency level.

Private Wealth 
Total estimated value of private wealth in Zambia is US$14 billion (ZMW 238 billion)
 High Net Worth Individuals in Zambia

See also
 Bank of Zambia
 Economy of Africa
 Zambia
 FORGE Program
 List of companies of Zambia
 United Nations Economic Commission for Africa
 :Category:Companies of Zambia

References

External links
 
 Zambia  latest trade data on ITC Trade Map
 Barbara Gunnell, New Statesman, May 24, 2004, "A conspiracy of the rich"
 CIA World Factbook Zambia
 MBendi Zambia overview
 UNDP in Zambia official site of the United Nations Development Programme in Zambia
 World Development Movement (2004), "Zambia: Condemned to debt"
 World Bank Summary Trade Statistics Zambia
 List of companies in Zambia

 
Zambia
Zambia